William Gamble (1 January 1818 – 20 December 1866) was a civil engineer and a United States Army cavalry officer. He served during the Second Seminole War, and fought for the Union during the American Civil War. He commanded one of two brigades in Brigadier General John Buford's Division of Cavalry, in which he played an important role in defending Union positions during the first day of the Battle of Gettysburg.

Early life
Gamble was born in the townland of Duross, Lisnarick, County Fermanagh, Ireland. He studied civil engineering, worked in the Queen's Surveying Office, and participated in the Northern Ireland survey. He emigrated to the United States in 1838. Since he had experience as a dragoon in the British army, he enlisted as a private in the 1st U.S. Dragoons and rose through the ranks to become Sergeant Major by 1839. While in the Army he married Sophia Steingrandt, daughter of King's German Legion Feldwebel Georg Steingrandt, on 6 May 1841, and they had 13 (by some accounts 15) children together. After fighting in the Seminole Wars, he was discharged in 1843 and worked as a civil engineer for the Board of Public Works in Chicago and lived in Evanston, Illinois. His house is now used by the Anthropology Department of Northwestern University.

Civil War
After the start of the Civil War, Gamble was appointed Lieutenant Colonel of the 8th Illinois Cavalry regiment on 18 September 1861. His nomination was urged by his close friend, U.S. Congressman John F. Farnsworth, who raised and commanded the regiment. Gamble's son George also joined the regiment as a first lieutenant. (George survived the war, but was killed in a collapsed hotel during the 1906 San Francisco earthquake).

Gamble's regiment was attached to the Pennsylvania Reserve Division and fought in the Peninsula Campaign, where he was wounded in the chest, leading a cavalry charge against rebel pickets more than a month after the end of the Seven Days Battles. After recovering from his wound, Gamble was promoted to colonel on 5 December 1862, just before the Battle of Fredericksburg, but his regiment saw no action in that fight. When Farnsworth was promoted, Gamble was given command of the 8th Illinois Cavalry. In the spring of 1863, he was promoted to command of the 1st Brigade of Maj. Gen. Alfred Pleasonton's cavalry division in the Army of the Potomac, but he was away from the Army on medical leave during the Battle of Chancellorsville. (Possibly as a result of his wound the year before or the severity of the winter, Gamble was suffering from rheumatism and neuralgia.)

During the Gettysburg Campaign, Gamble continued on leave and missed the largest predominantly cavalry battle of the war, Brandy Station. The officer in temporary command of his brigade, Colonel Benjamin Franklin Davis, was killed there, and Gamble returned to the field on 13 June 1863. His brigade was assigned to Brig. Gen. John Buford's 1st Division. He reached Gettysburg on 30 June and was riding at the head of the column when they spotted the first elements of the Confederate Army of Northern Virginia and began the Battle of Gettysburg on the morning of 1 July.

While his troops were hopelessly outnumbered, they slowed the progress of the Mississippi brigades from Lt. Gen. A.P. Hill's corps for about two hours while Union infantry from Maj. Gen. John F. Reynolds's I Corps (James S. Wadsworth's division) hurried to join the fight. When it came time to retire, Colonel Gamble's troops moved to the infantry's left flank. Gamble, along with the rest of Buford's cavalry, had provided a crucial window of time to get the Union Army into position.

Later in 1863, Gamble commanded a cavalry division in the XXII Corps of the Department of Washington for the remainder of the war. He was involved in the defenses of Washington, D.C., and his troopers also tangled with the Confederate partisan ranger, John S. Mosby. He commanded the remount station at Camp Stoneman, but the lingering effects of his wounds prevented any further field service. Gamble received a brevet promotion to brigadier general on 12 December 1864, and a full promotion to brigadier general on 25 September 1865. He was mustered out of the volunteer service on 13 March 1866, and reentered the service with the rank of major in the 8th U.S. Cavalry.

Postbellum life
Gamble died of cholera in Virgin Bay, Nicaragua, while en route to command of the Presidio of San Francisco, and is buried in Virgin Bay in the Virgin Grove Cemetery, a burial ground which has been flooded and obliterated by the waters of the Bay.

In popular media
Gamble was portrayed by Buck Taylor in the 1993 film Gettysburg, based on Michael Shaara's novel, The Killer Angels. He appears in the alternate history novel Gettysburg: A Novel of the Civil War, in which he is taken as a prisoner of war.

References
 Eicher, John H., and David J. Eicher. Civil War High Commands. Stanford, CA: Stanford University Press, 2001. .
 Petruzzi, J. David. "General John Buford's Cavalry in the Gettysburg Campaign"
 Petruzzi, J. David. "John Buford: By the Book." America's Civil War, July 2005.
 Warner, Ezra J. Generals in Blue: Lives of the Union Commanders. Baton Rouge: Louisiana State University Press, 1964. .
 Gettysburg Discussion Group online biography

1818 births
1866 deaths
19th-century Irish people
Irish engineers
Irish soldiers
Irish emigrants to the United States (before 1923)
Military personnel from County Fermanagh
People from Evanston, Illinois
People of Illinois in the American Civil War
American people of Scotch-Irish descent
United States Army generals
British Army soldiers
Deaths from cholera
Infectious disease deaths in Nicaragua